The 15th National Basketball Association All-Star Game was played on January 13, 1965, in St. Louis. The coaches were Red Auerbach for the East, and Alex Hannum for the West.

Western Conference

Eastern Conference

Score by Periods
 

Halftime— East, 75-61
Third Quarter— East, 107-91
Officials: Mendy Rudolph and Joe Gushue
Attendance: 16,713.

References 

National Basketball Association All-Star Game
All-Star